The 2022 ACA Africa T20 Cup was a cricket tournament played in Benoni, Gauteng, South Africa. The finals tournament was originally scheduled to be held in September 2019, but was moved to March 2020, with the original host city being Nairobi, Kenya. On 9 March 2020, the tournament was postponed again due to the COVID-19 pandemic, in line with the Kenyan government's 30-day ban on international gatherings. The tournament was eventually rescheduled for September 2022.

The tournament finals were originally to be contested by the top two teams from each of three regional qualification events, plus South Africa and Zimbabwe as automatic qualifiers. It was later decided to make the tournament open only to associate members of the International Cricket Council, and so two additional teams from the qualifiers would be entered into the finals in place of the two full members. Ghana and Nigeria qualified from the North-Western region in April 2018, with Cameroon later granted an additional place in the finals. Botswana, Malawi and Mozambique progressed from the Southern region in November 2018. The Eastern qualifier was due to be played in Nairobi in July 2018, but did not take place; Kenya and Uganda were automatically advanced to the finals. Shortly before the finals in September 2022, Nigeria were replaced in the tournament by Tanzania.

All matches played in the tournament finals had full T20I status as the ICC granted T20I status to matches between all of its members from 1 January 2019.

Uganda defeated Tanzania in the final with Riazat Ali Shah (98*) leading a remarkable chase after the team had needed 49 runs from the last three overs.

North-Western qualifier

The North-Western qualifier for the ACA Africa T20 Cup took place in Lagos, Nigeria, in April 2018, starting two days after the conclusion of the North-Western sub-regional qualifier for the 2021 ICC T20 World Cup. Cameroon took part in the ACA Africa T20 Cup qualifier, having not participated in the T20 World Cup qualifier.

Points table

Fixtures

Semi-finals

Final

Southern qualifier

The Southern qualifier for the ACA Africa T20 Cup took place in Gaborone, Botswana, in November 2018, starting two days after the conclusion of the Southern sub-regional qualifier for the 2021 ICC T20 World Cup. Eswatini, Lesotho and Namibia all participated in the T20 World Cup qualifier, but did not take part in the ACA Africa T20 Cup qualifier.

Points table

Fixtures

ACA Africa T20 Cup Finals

The eight qualified teams were split into two groups, with the top two teams from each group advancing to the semi-finals. The finals were played at Willowmoore Park in Benoni, Gauteng, South Africa. All matches played in the tournament finals had T20I status as the ICC granted T20I status to matches between all of its members from 1 January 2019.

Squads

The Kenyan squad was missing the injured Eugene Ochieng, as well as the rested Sachin Bhudia, Alex Obanda and Collins Obuya. The Ugandan squad was also missing several senior players, with Joseph Baguma, Munir Ismail and Pascal Murungi being promoted from the under-19 team.

Group stage

Group A

 Advanced to the semi-finals

Group B

 Advanced to the semi-finals

Semi-finals

Final

References

External links
 Series home at CricHQ (North-Western qualifier)
 Series home at CricClubs (Southern qualifier)
 Series home at ESPN Cricinfo (Finals)

Cricket in Africa
Associate international cricket competitions in 2022–23
ACA